Palézieux-Village railway station serves the village of Palézieux, in the canton of Vaud, Switzerland. It is an intermediate stop on the standard gauge Palézieux–Lyss line of Swiss Federal Railways.

Services
 the following services stop at Palézieux-Village:

 RER Vaud:

References

External links
 
 

Railway stations in the canton of Vaud
Swiss Federal Railways stations
Railway stations in Switzerland opened in 1876